Santa Cruz de los Cáñamos (also called SCdlC or simply SCC) is a municipality located in the province of Ciudad Real, Castile-La Mancha, Spain. It has a population of 554 (2014).

Mayor 
Isidro Sánchez became the first blind mayor of Spain, with 229 votes in favor, and 183 against.

References

Municipalities in the Province of Ciudad Real